Dito CME Holdings Corporation (formerly known as ISM Communications Corporation) is a Filipino conglomerate holding firm. Formed in 1925, the company primarily engages in telecommunications and information technology infrastructure.

History

The early years
Itogon-Suyoc Mines, Inc. was founded in January 1925 as a mining company. During the 2000s, the company (which subsequently renamed as ISM Communications Corporation in April 2002) began diversified with the investments in different industry sectors such as telecommunications (a stake in Eastern Telecommunications Philippines, later divested in 2011), gaming and hospitality (a 65% stake in Acentic GmbH), and banking (a 97% stake in Philippine Bank of Communications, sold to Lucio Co), before it became a holding company in 2016.

Dennis Uy era
In August 2018, businessman Dennis Uy bought a 45% controlling stake in ISM, and in March 2020, the firm was renamed as Dito CME Holdings Corporation.

In November 2020, Dito CME announced its share swap deal with Uy's Udenna Corporation to indirect owning its stake in telecommunications company and its namesake, Dito Telecommunity. As part of a deal, Dito CME will own a 100% stake in Udenna's subsidiary, Udenna CME Holdings Corporation which co-owns (along with another Udenna subsidiary, Chelsea Logistics) one of Dito's parent companies, Dito Holdings Corporation (the other is the Chinese state-owned China Telecommunications Corporation). The deal made Udenna Corporation became as a parent company of Dito CME.

In June 2021, Dito CME (through its subsidiary, ISM Equities Corporation (now DITO CME Ventures, Inc.)) signed a sales-and-supply agreement with Samsung Electronics Philippines.

In July 2021, Dito CME announced its partnership with Alibaba Cloud to provide cloud computing and storage products for its digital educational platform, Luna Academy.

In January 2022, Dito CME dropped the Rights offering of US$156 million for the expansion in Philippines citing the reason of "less than ideal market conditions."

References

Holding companies of the Philippines
Companies based in Taguig
Holding companies established in 1925
Companies listed on the Philippine Stock Exchange
1925 establishments in the Philippines
Udenna Corporation